Faouzi Bensaïdi (born 14 March 1967) is a Moroccan film director, actor, screenwriter and artist. His film A Thousand Months was screened in the Un Certain Regard section at the 2003 Cannes Film Festival.

In 2007 and 2009 he has taken part in the Arts in Marrakech Festival showing and discussing his films and installations.

In 2011, his film Death for Sale premiered at the Toronto International Film Festival in September. The film was selected as the Moroccan entry for the Best Foreign Language Oscar at the 85th Academy Awards, but it did not make the final shortlist.

Selected filmography
 Mektoub (1997)
 A Thousand Months (2003)
 WWW: What a Wonderful World (2006)
 Death for Sale (2011)
Volubilis (2017)
Sofia (2018)

References

External links

1967 births
Living people
Moroccan film directors
Moroccan male film actors
Moroccan screenwriters